Dmitri Arhip (born 12 November 1988) is a Moldovan rugby union player who plays for the Cardiff Rugby at Tighthead Prop. He is also a Moldovan international.

Arhip made his debut for the Ospreys in 2012 having previously played for CS Dinamo București, Enisei-STM and Bridgend Ravens.

Arhip scored his first Ospreys try in his first season against Newport Gwent Dragons.

On New Years Day, 2016, Arhip won his 50th cap for the Ospreys against Newport Gwent Dragons.

Arhip signed for the Cardiff Rugby ahead of the 2018–2019 season.

References

External links 
Ospreys Player Profile
ESPN Player Profile
Profile at scoresway

Moldovan rugby union players
Ospreys (rugby union) players
Living people
1988 births
Rugby union props
Cardiff Rugby players
Yenisey-STM Krasnoyarsk players